Residuary Body for Wales was a non-departmental public body.

History 

The Residuary Body for Wales was established by Local Government (Wales) Act 1994, taking up its duties on 1 February 1995. It was formed primarily to give advice to the Secretary of State for Wales, in respect of the transfer of property, rights and liabilities and related functions from an abolished authority either to a new Principal Council or other public body or the Residuary Body. From 1 April 1996, the Body's role changed, to the management and disposal of any transferred properties.

The Body was abolished in 1998 under Government of Wales Act 1998. Its functions, property rights and liabilities were transferred to various Welsh principal areas.

References 

Economy of Wales
Defunct public bodies of the United Kingdom